The Menthidae are a small family of pseudoscorpions that are nevertheless spread around the world. While Menthus is found from Mexico to California, Oligomenthus lives in South America. The monotypic genera Paramenthus and Thenmus live in Israel and Australia, respectively.

Species
 Menthus J.C. Chamberlin, 1930
 Menthus californicus J.C. Chamberlin, 1930 — California
 Menthus gracilis (Banks, 1909) — Mexico
 Menthus mexicanus Hoff, 1945 — Mexico
 Menthus rossi (J.C. Chamberlin, 1923) — Mexico

 Oligomenthus Beier, 1962
 Oligomenthus argentinus Beier, 1962 — Argentina
 Oligomenthus chilensis Vitali-di Castro, 1969 — Chile

 Paramenthus Beier, 1963
 Paramenthus shulovi Beier, 1963 — Israel

 Thenmus Harvey, in Harvey & Muchmore 1990
 Thenmus aigialites Harvey, in Harvey & Muchmore 1990 — Queensland

References 

 Joel Hallan's Biology Catalog: Menthidae

 
Pseudoscorpion families